Michael Sean Martinez (born March 25, 1979), better known by his stage name Onry Ozzborn, is an American rapper and producer from Seattle, Washington. He is a founding member of alternative hip hop groups such as Grayskul, Dark Time Sunshine, and Oldominion, among others.

Onry Ozzborn has collaborated with notable artists such as Aesop Rock, Sleep, Mr. Lif, P.O.S, Slug, and Busdriver.

Life and career

1997-2003: Formation of Oldominon, Oraclez Creed, Polarity and The Grey Area 
Michael Martinez was born and raised in a small town in Farmington, New Mexico. Here, he grew up playing baseball and creating hip hop music. In the small town's elementary school, he came to know another hip hop artist named Sleep, who alongside Pale Soul, created his first hip hop group, Oraclez Creed. Following Martinez's graduation, the group was put on hold as the members disbanded, with Martinez attending college in Arizona for his scholarship earned as a baseball player. Following a year, Sleep invited Martinez to visit Seattle, Washington. This visit led Martinez to drop out of school and focus solely on his musical career. Oraclez Creed soon came back together and through making connections in the Pacific Northwest hip hop scene, they met another trio of rappers named Frontline, which consisted of Destro, Nyqwil, and Snafu. Soon enough, the six founded the prominent collective known as Oldominion.

In 2002, Onry Ozzborn formed the duo Norman, consisting of Oldominion emcee Barfly and Onry himself. Together, they released the critically acclaimed rap opera album Polarity. Pitchfork gave it a very favorable 8.3 out of 10, saying: "The duo's cadences play leapfrog with the beats, and they often rap at halftime for a surreal effect. The depressive, layered production reflects the isolating, wet darkness that grips the Pacific Northwest nine months out of the year. It's the unmistakable sound of Seattle hip-hop."

Following various solo albums being released independently, Onry Ozzborn released his 2003 breakthrough solo album The Grey Area. It features guest appearances from Qwel, Luckyiam and Sleep, among others. The album was given very positive reviews, with XLR8R saying: "Onry Ozzborn gives us an album of wonderfully intricate storytelling and mostly tight production. Call it goth hop, call it abstract, call it what you want-we call it dope." The album also featured Onry's first collaborations with producer Mr. Hill, another Oldominion member who would help shape a new sound for Seattle and Grayskul alike.

2004-2007: Grayskul and Rhymesayers era 
Through other Oldominion members and the local Seattle scene, Onry met another emcee named JFK Ninjaface. JFK Ninjaface was new to the circuit, as he had just moved from Virginia Beach, Virginia to live with his aunt after several run-ins with the law. At the time, he was only freestyling before meeting Onry Ozzborn, who had encouraged JFK to write. Not much later, the two formed the hip hop duo Grayskul. The duo's music went from being released independently to being in the hands of Siddiq, the CEO of indie hip hop label Rhymesayers Entertainment. Siddiq signed them and released their 2005 album Deadlivers, with most production handled by Mr. Hill. The album featured appearances from Canibus, Mr. Lif and Aesop Rock, the latter becoming a frequent collaborator to Onry Ozzborn. In the same year, Onry Ozzbron released his solo album In Between.

2008-2012: Fake Four Inc, No Hoax, Hold On For Dear Life and Dark Time Sunshine 
Subsequently following the release of two Grayskul albums on Rhymesayers, Onry released No Hoax separately as EP's in preparation to the release of his solo album Hold On For Dear Life. The album reached #3 on KEXP charts and garnered favorable reviews as well. In 2009, he met the Chicago producer Zavala and formed the group Dark Time Sunshine. Later that year, he signed to Ceschi's indie label Fake Four Inc.

2013: Zenith 
In 2013, Grayskul released their long awaited follow up album Zenith.

2016 - present: Duo, C V P ii D, Nervous Hvnd, THE RvTTLESNvKE MvRTINEZ MIXTvPE 
In 2016, Onry Ozzborn released Duo, a solo album which included guest features on every track from artists such as Kimya Dawson, Rob Sonic and P.O.S, among others. The album was released with a video consisting of short snippets of the album and played together as a short film.

In February 2017, Onry released C V P ii D (pronounced as Cupid) featuring Alison Baker.

In September 2018, Onry released Nervous Hvnd, a solo album which included guest features from DJ Comfortable Kathy/vioLit, Ethos, and Swamburger. Like previous albums, Nervous Hvnd released with a music video featuring short snippets from the album.

In October 2018, Onry released a surprise mixtape THE RvTTLESNvKE MvRTINEZ MIXTvPE which included guest features from Iame and Scotty Del.

Style 
Onry Ozzborn's lyrical style has been described as brooding, thoughtful, and unique. He is also known to use different names depending on the project he is working on.

Discography

Solo

Studio albums 
 Knightingale
 Released: March 22, 1997
 Label: Self-released
 Alone
 Released: January 8, 2002
 Label: BSI Records/One Drop Records
 The Grey Area
 Released: June 17, 2003
 Label: One Drop Records
 In Between
 Released: November 8, 2005
 Label: Camobear Records
 Hold On For Dear Life
 Released: January 25, 2011
 Label: Fake Four Inc.
 Duo
 Released: March 29, 2016
 Label: Fake Four Inc.
 C V P ii D
 Released: February 28, 2017
 Label: Ted Records
 Nervous Hvnd
 Released: September 13, 2018 
 Label: Ted Records
 Tantrum (Nigel)
 Released: November 22, 2019
 Label: Michael Martinez

EP's 
 Venom EP
 Released: January 31, 2001
 Label: BSI Records
 No Hoax (1-4)
 Released: December 26, 2010
 Label: Fake Four Inc.

Mixtapes 
 "Black Phillip"
 Released: July 17, 2017
 Label: 300 Club Records
 THE RvTTLESNvKE MvRTINEZ MIXTvPE
 Released: October 31, 2018

Collaborative

Aurora

"S7V7N Days" (with Sleep) 
 Released: July 14, 2001
 Label: Momentum Studios

Norman

Polarity (with Barfly)
 Released: March 4, 2003
 Label: Under The Needle

References

External links
 Onry Ozzborn at Discogs
 Onry Ozzborn at Fake Four Inc
 Grayskul at Rhymesayers Entertainment
 Grayskul at Discogs
 Dark Time Sunshine at Fake Four Inc
 Dark Time Sunshine on Discogs

Living people
American male rappers
Record producers from Washington (state)
Record producers from New Mexico
Underground rappers
1979 births
21st-century American rappers
People from Farmington, New Mexico
Rappers from Seattle
21st-century American male musicians